Sutter Pointe, California is a proposed planned community in Sutter County, approximately 4 miles north of the City of Sacramento.

Sutter Pointe is the largest development in Sutter County and would accommodate 47,000 to 49,000 people over a 20 to 30-year build-out.

Sutter Pointe was approved by Sutter County Board of Supervisors on June 30, 2009.

Lakeside at Sutter Pointe was approved in November 2020.

Home construction companies that will build in the development include Lennar and Winn Communities.

References

Proposed populated places in the United States
Sutter County, California